The 1990 Auburn Tigers football team represented Auburn University in the 1990 NCAA Division I-A football season.  Coached by Pat Dye, the team finished the season with an 8–3–1 record and ended their streak of three Southeastern Conference titles.  The Tigers defeated Indiana, 27–23, in the Peach Bowl.

Schedule

Roster

References

Auburn
Auburn Tigers football seasons
Peach Bowl champion seasons
Auburn Tigers football